"Ain't My Fault" is a song by Swedish singer Zara Larsson. It was released on 2 September 2016, by TEN Music Group, Epic Records, and Sony Music, as the third single from her second and international debut studio album, So Good. The official remix features American rapper Lil Yachty.

Background
In an interview with Shazam, Larsson said about the first version of the song: "The topic is me talking to a girl about her man, and I basically stole her man, and I'm like, 'It's not my fault that I'm better than you'." The song was written in a few hours with MNEK for fun and never intended as a single, but when the studio loved it, her reaction was, "Whoa whoa whoa I can't sing this." So she changed the lyrics of the song to reflect her values: "I would never be proud of stealing a girl's man and sing about it, it would be very not me."

Music video
The music video was released on 30 September 2016 via Larsson's official Vevo account. It was directed by Emil Nava and primarily features Larsson performing dance moves with her girlfriends.

Critical reception
Robbie Daw of Idolator stated the song is "a sexy departure from the somber dulcet tones of 'Never Forget You' and the sassy pop swagger of 'Lush Life'" and went on to call it a "Rihanna-esque banger" and a "saucy gem". Entertainment Weeklys Nolan Feeney called the song "bold" and "club-ready".

Track listing
Digital download
"Ain't My Fault" – 3:44

Digital download
"Ain't My Fault" (J Hus & Fred VIP Mix) – 3:31

Digital download
"Ain't My Fault" (R3hab Remix) – 2:38

Digital download
"Ain't My Fault" (Remix) (featuring Lil Yachty) – 3:58

Charts

Weekly charts

Year-end charts

Certifications

Release history

References

2016 songs
2016 singles
Zara Larsson songs
Number-one singles in Sweden
Songs written by MNEK
Songs written by Marcus Sepehrmanesh
Songs written by Zara Larsson
Epic Records singles
Sony Music singles